Far Eastern Railway is a railway in Russia that crosses Primorsky Krai, Khabarovsk Krai, Amur Oblast, Jewish Autonomous Oblast, and Yakutia.

Information
The railway administration is located in Khabarovsk. The Far Eastern Railway borders with the Transbaikal Railway at Arkhara Station and Baikal Amur Mainline at Izvestkovaya and Komsomolsk-on-Amur Stations. There are 365 railway stations along the Far Eastern Railway and two border crossings: Grodekovo (Russo-Chinese border) and Khasan (a border between Russia and North Korea). The Railway consists of four divisions: the Khabarovsk Railway Division, Vladivostok Railway Division, Komsomolskoye Railway Division, and Tynda Railway Division. The biggest points of cargo departure and arrival are Khabarovsk-2, Izvestkovaya, Birobidzhan, Volochayevka-2, Komsomolsk-on-Amur, Sovetskaya Gavan, Sibirtsevo, Ussuriysk, Baranovsky, Uglovaya, Vladivostok, Nakhodka, Nakhodka Vostochnaya, and Vanino.

Statistics 
Total working length: 
Number of employees: 50,331
Net weight hauled: 51,736 million tonnes
Long-distance passenger traffic: 5 million people
Suburban traffic: 19,990 million people

History
The construction of the Far Eastern Railway commenced in May 1891 due to the economic development of the Russian Far East. In 1895, they opened regular train service between Vladivostok and Iman (today's Dalnerechenskaya railway station). In 1897, they commissioned the Khabarovsk-Vladivostok line. Direct train traffic from the Arkhara railway station to Vladivostok was launched in 1916 with the commissioning of the railroad bridge over the Amur River near Khabarovsk. More than 5,000 railmen were employed at the Far Eastern Railway in 1900. 

 

During the Russian Civil War and the foreign military intervention the employees of the Far Eastern Railway had to rebuild destroyed bridges and damaged tracks and ensure stable traffic of urgent loads. Rail line restoration began in the winter of 1924-1925 from the reconstruction of the Khabarovsk Bridge due to the importance of resuming a through traffic over the Trans-Siberian Railway. In 1929, they built the Nadezhdinskaya-Tavrichanka line for the needs of the Primorsky Krai (for the servicing of agricultural regions near the Khanka Lake, in particular). In 1931, they finished the construction of the Sibirtsevo-Turiy Rog line. In 1935–1936, they reconstructed the Uglovaya-Partizansk line due to the increasing extraction of coking coal from the Suchansky coalfields. In 1940, they commissioned the Volochayevka-Komsomolsk-on-Amur line and Sibirtsevo-Varfolomeyevka line. In 1941, they finished the construction of the Birobidzhan-Leninsk line and Partizansk-Nakhodka section and commissioned the Smolyaninovo-Dunai, Partizansk-Sergeyevka, and Baranovsky-Gvozdevo lines. In 1940, they finished the construction of the main eastward sorting station called Khabarovsk-2 with a fully mechanized hump yard. 

By the outbreak of the Great Patriotic War, the Far Eastern Railway had already had a well-developed infrastructure. It was put on a war footing in a very short period of time and began supplying the Eastern Front with military equipment, ammunition, and provisions. The railway management provided frontline railroads with staff, rolling stock, spare parts, and materials. Also, the Far Eastern Railway played an important role in assisting the Soviet Army in defeating the Imperial Japanese Army and seizing Southern Sakhalin and the Kuril Islands. 

In 1947, the Komsomolsk-on-Amur—Sovetskaya Gavan line was commissioned, providing the second (after the Trans-Siberian Railway) railroad access to the Pacific Ocean and cutting the distance in 1000 km for maritime transportation to Sakhalin, Kamchatka, and Magadan Oblast. Due to the lack of bridge crossing over the Amur River near Komsomolsk-on-Amur, railcars crossed the river on a train ferry in the summertime and with special train platforms during the winter. 

In 1963, the  gauge South Sakhalin Railway was incorporated into the Far Eastern Railway. In 1973, Vanino-Kholmsk train ferry started operating, improving transportation service in Sakhalin. In 1975,  a unique railway river crossing over the Amur River near Komsomolsk-on-Amur was commissioned, providing a continuous year-round railway service between Volochayevka and Sovetskaya Gavan. New rail yards, such as Toki, Komsomolsk-Sortirovochniy, Nakhodka Vostochnaya etc. were opened.

Future plans

The Far Eastern Railway management is hoping to implement the idea of constructing the Trans-Korean Main Line and then connect it with the Trans-Siberian Railway one day. Indeed, further development of the Khasan—Tumangang border crossing may provide additional 10 million tonnes of cargo per year, according to some forecasts, let alone a potential two-way traffic of up to 200,000 cargo containers per year from the port of Busan.

The Grodekovo—Suifenhe City border crossing in Primorsky Krai also plays an important role in the Russo-Chinese economic relations. The freight traffic between the two countries increases by one million tonnes per year. Strong ties with the ports and the neighboring Harbin Railway and coordination of joint efforts in restoring and modernizing railway stations allows to forecast an almost two-fold increase of freight traffic by 2010 in South Primorye.

See also
 Canadian National Railway: The railway which dealt with similar geographic situation and remote location until 1988.

References

External links 

 

Railway lines in Russia
1895 in rail transport
Rail transport in the Soviet Union
Rail transport in Siberia 
Rail transport in the Russian Far East
Rail transport in Primorsky Krai
Rail transport in Khabarovsk Krai
Rail transport in Amur Oblast
Rail transport in the Jewish Autonomous Oblast
Rail transport in the Sakha Republic
Rail transport in Magadan Oblast
Rail transport in Sakhalin Oblast
Rail transport in Kamchatka Krai
Rail transport in Chukotka Autonomous Okrug